There were 138 cyclists registered for the race, of which 113 started the first stage of the 1920 Tour de France. 31 of those were in the first class, the other 82 in the second class.
Favourites were Christophe, Mottiat, Thys, Belloni, Alavoine and Henri Pelissier.

By starting number

By nationality

References

1920 Tour de France
1920